Maria Theresa (1717–1780) was Queen Regnant of Hungary and Bohemia, Archduchess of Austria and ruler of the rest of the Habsburg Monarchy (1740-1780).

Maria Theresa, Maria Teresa, or Maria Theresia may also refer to:

People

House of Habsburg
 Maria Theresa of Spain (1638–1683), Queen of France
 Archduchess Maria Theresa of Austria (1684–1696), daughter of Leopold I, Holy Roman Emperor and Eleonor Magdalene of Neuburg
 Archduchess Maria Theresa of Austria (1762–1770), daughter of Joseph II, Holy Roman Emperor and Princess Isabella of Parma
 Maria Theresa of Austria (1767–1827), Queen of Saxony
 Maria Theresa of Naples and Sicily (1772–1807), Empress of Austria
 Maria Theresa of Austria-Este (1773–1832), Queen of Sardinia
 Maria Theresa of Austria (1801–1855), Queen of Sardinia
 Maria Theresa of Austria (1816–1867), Queen of the Two Sicilies
 Archduchess Maria Theresa of Austria-Este (1817–1886), Countess of Chambord
 Maria Theresa of Austria-Este (1849–1919), Queen of Bavaria

House of Braganza
 Infanta Maria Theresa of Portugal (1855–1944), Archduchess of Austria
 Princess Maria Theresa of Löwenstein-Wertheim-Rosenberg (1870-1935), Duchess of Braganza
 Maria Teresa, Princess of Beira (1783-1984), Portuguese Infanta

House of Savoy
Princess Maria Theresa of Savoy (1756-1805), Countess of Artois
Princess Maria Teresa of Savoy (1803-1879), Duchess of Parma

Other people
 Maria Teresa, Grand Duchess of Luxembourg (1956-Present)
 Maria Teresa Landi, Italian epidemiologist and oncologist 
 Maria Teresa Rafaela of Spain (1726-1746), Infanta of Spain
 María Teresa Rejas (born 1946), Spanish politician
 Maria Theresia Ahlefeldt, composer and Countess of Ahlefeldt-Langeland
 Maria Teresa of Bourbon-Parma (1933–2020), known as the "red princess"

Places
Maria Theresa Reef, a reef in the South Pacific
Maria Theresia Garden Square (Uzhhorod), a Ukrainian public square
Maria-Theresia-Gymnasium, a school in Munich

Other uses 
22nd SS Volunteer Cavalry Division Maria Theresia, a Waffen-SS Division commonly known by the name Maria Theresia
Maria Theresa (film), a 1951 Austrian film
Maria Theresia (miniseries), an Austria-Czech television miniseries
Maria Theresa thaler, a silver bullion coin

People with the given names
María Teresa Andruetto, Argentina children's writer
Maria Teresa Armengol, Andorran politician
Maria Theresia Bonzel, German nun
Maria Teresa Carlson, Filipina actor and model
María Teresa Fernández de la Vega, Spanish politician
María Teresa Ferrari, Argentina doctor
Maria Teresa de Filippis, Italian racecar driver
María Teresa Lara, a Mexican composer
Maria Theresa Longworth, plaintiff in an Irish mixed religion marriage case
Maria Teresa Merlo, Italian abbess
María Teresa Mirabal, Dominican political activist
María Teresa Mora, a Cuban chess master
María Teresa Oller (1920-2018), Spanish composer and folklorist
Maria Theresia von Paradis, Austria composer
Maria Teresa Ruta, Italian TV personality

See also

 Maria (disambiguation)
 Marie Thérèse (disambiguation)
 Teresa (disambiguation)